Wilmington is a town in Windham County, Vermont, United States. The population was 2,255 at the 2020 census.

History
The town was chartered in 1751 by Benning Wentworth, colonial governor of New Hampshire. It was named in honor of Spencer Compton, 1st Earl of Wilmington. Wilmington is the home of Haystack Mountain Ski Area, which operates as the private Hermitage Club.

Part of the village of Wilmington comprises the Wilmington Village Historic District, listed on the National Register of Historic Places.

Geography
According to the United States Census Bureau, the town has a total area of 41.3 square miles (106.9 km2), of which 39.4 square miles (102.1 km2) is land and 1.8 square miles (4.7 km2) (4.39%) is water. Wilmington is drained by the North Branch Deerfield River, as well as Meadow Brook, Rose Brook, Haystack Brook, Hall Brook, Ellis Brook, Beaver Brook, Negus Brook and Wilder Brook. It is located in the Deerfield Valley of the Green Mountains.

There are two census-designated places in the town. The village of Wilmington is in the center of the town, and Chimney Hill is in the west.

Transportation
The town is crossed by:
Vermont Route 9
Vermont Route 100

The Deerfield Valley Transit Association (DVTA) is the primary public local bus transportation provider for Wilmington and the rest of the Deerfield Valley. Their nickname, "the MOOver", derives from their buses' black and white Holstein cow paint scheme and appearance. In addition, weekday express bus service to Bennington is provided by both the DVTA (mornings) and the Green Mountain Express' Emerald Line (evenings).

The closest Greyhound bus stop and Amtrak train station to Wilmington is in Brattleboro.

Demographics

As of the census of 2000, there were 2,225 people, 992 households, and 597 families residing in the town.  The population density was 56.4 people per square mile (21.8/km2). There were 2,232 housing units at an average density of 56.6 per square mile (21.9/km2). The racial makeup of the town was 97.80% White, 0.22% African American, 0.27% Native American, 0.58% Asian, 0.18% from other races, and 0.94% from two or more races. Hispanic or Latino of any race were 0.94% of the population.

There were 992 households, out of which 26.0% had children under the age of 18 living with them, 48.6% were married couples living together, 7.8% had a female householder with no husband present, and 39.8% were non-families. 32.5% of all households were made up of individuals, and 8.0% had someone living alone who was 65 years of age or older. The average household size was 2.24 and the average family size was 2.84.

In the town, the population was spread out, with 21.6% under the age of 18, 7.0% from 18 to 24, 26.7% from 25 to 44, 30.6% from 45 to 64, and 14.1% who were 65 years of age or older. The median age was 42 years. For every 100 females, there were 101.0 males.  For every 100 females age 18 and over, there were 98.7 males.

The median income for a household in the town was $37,396, and the median income for a family was $46,786. Males had a median income of $29,511 versus $23,417 for females. The per capita income for the town was $25,171. About 7.0% of families and 9.3% of the population were below the poverty line, including 15.2% of those under age 18 and 5.6% of those age 65 or over.

Education
A consolidation took place between Whitingham High School (WHS) and Wilmington Middle High School (WMHS) and the local school is now called Twin Valley High School (TVHS). Towards the end of 2005, a proposal was made to construct a new high school, however, voters rejected the needed bond issue.

Climate
Wilmington experiences a humid continental climate (Koppen Dfb) with warm, humid summers and cold (sometimes severely cold) winters. While snowfall can vary greatly from year to year in nearby towns like Bennington and Brattleboro, Wilmington's snowfall is consistently heavy each year because of its elevation in the Green Mountains' high country.

Tropical Storm Irene
August 28, 2011 – The town of Wilmington, and the state of Vermont, was hit by Tropical Storm Irene. 13 inches of rainfall came through the course of 10 hours, comparable to dumping 26 swimming pools on every acre of land. The rivers flooded over their banks washing away buildings, destroying downtown businesses and inventory, and displacing families from their homes. In terms of infrastructure, Wilmington was the hardest hit town in the entire state. Almost immediately after the storm subsided residents began the work of cleaning up and figuring out how to turn this devastating tragedy into a blessing. Within days the National Guard was repairing washed out roads, businesses were getting cleaned out, and fund raising began to help affected people and businesses to get back on their feet. The Wilmington Flood Relief Fund, chaired by Adam Palmiter, raised just shy of $500,000 to benefit local businesses and flood relief throughout the Deerfield Valley. By the date of the one year anniversary, the town was again thriving with many businesses back better than ever, tourists excited to shop locally, and new opportunities on the horizon thanks to a broader outlook in the years to come.

Vermont snowfall record

Wilmington is in the heart of the Southern Vermont snowbelt. This snowbelt lies mainly within the southern Vermont portion of the Green Mountain National Forest and includes the high elevation Southern Vermont towns of Woodford, Searsburg, Wilmington and Marlboro.
Between February 24 and February 27, 2010, Wilmington received a record  of snow. Over  of snow fell during this February 2010 blizzard. Snowfall amounts of 
The February 2010 blizzard in Wilmington and West Dover appears to be the single storm snowfall record for anywhere in the state of Vermont in Vermont weather record keeping history.

Notable people 

 G. William Hamilton, legislator
 James William Locke, lawyer and judge
 Elswyth Thane, romance novelist
 James Manning Tyler, judge and United States congressman
 Halsey William Wilson, publisher

References

External links

 Town of Wilmington, Vermont
 Pettee Memorial Library
 Historical Society of Wilmington

 
Towns in Vermont
Towns in Windham County, Vermont
1751 establishments in the Thirteen Colonies